General Abdikarim Yusuf Adam was a Somali military official. He was the Chief of Army until his death by gunshot on November 1, 2015. He hailed from the Surre clan one of the noble clans in Somalia. Mr Adam is regarded as one of the most patriotic commanders ever from Somalia after his lifetime battle with Alshabab, a terrorist group in Somalia.

References

Somalian military leaders
Somalian generals
2015 deaths
Year of birth missing